Fading Suns is a science fiction space opera role-playing game published by Holistic Design. The setting was also used for a PC game (Emperor of the Fading Suns), a live action role-playing game (Passion Play), and for a space combat miniature game (Noble Armada).

History
After the computer game Machiavelli the Prince, Holistic Design decided to do something new - a space strategy computer game, which would eventually become Emperor of the Fading Suns (1996). Holistic brought on two experienced world designers, Andrew Greenberg and Bill Bridges, to create a cohesive and interesting universe for the game, which would also be used as the basis for a tabletop role-playing game to be released simultaneously. Greenberg and Bridges had helped define the style of White Wolf Publishing's World of Darkness and, according to Shannon Appelcline, people noticed this game's similarity to the "White Wolf style". Appelcline comments further: "Fading Suns is unique mainly for its distinctive setting. It is a hard science-fiction game, but much of the universe has fallen back to Medieval technology: noble houses, guilds and a monolithic church control most of the power in the universe. Many people compare the universe to that of Frank Herbert's Dune, though Bridges points to Gene Wolfe's The Book of the New Sun, Isaac Asimov's Foundation and others as his inspiration."Over the next few years Fading Suns was supported extensively with supplements and for a time the line did well. Holistic released the table-top miniatures game Noble Armada (1998) – co-designed by Ken Lightner and Chris Wiese – a spaceship combat game compatible with Fading Suns. Passion Play (1999) was a LARP for Fading Suns. Holistic printed a d20 version of Fading Suns (2001), and then dual-statted later Fading Suns supplements to use both d20 and their own "Victory Point System". Over the next few years Holistic announced a third edition of Fading Suns as well as new games called variously Diaspora, Dystopia, Inc, and Sathranet, which would have been designed using d20 Modern and would have looked into different periods in Fading Suns'  history. However, none of these products were released. In 2007 Holistic Design licensed Fading Suns to RedBrick, and in 2012 the license passed to FASA Games, Inc, which released a revised edition of Fading Suns later that year. In 2014 FASA Games announced they would be releasing a new version of Noble Armada. In 2016 Holistic Design licensed the publishing rights for Fading Suns to Ulisses Spiele, who announced they were planning a new edition, with products published in both English and German. FASA Games retained the license for Noble Armada products and miniatures.

Game setting 
The action is set in the Known Worlds, a future medieval-analogue empire built on the remains of a previous, more sophisticated human space-faring civilization made possible by ancient "jumpgates". The jumpgates are relics left by the mysterious Anunnaki, an ancient civilization (or civilizations) which seem to have influenced the evolution of lesser species, such as humans, for their own end, and waged a devastating war many millennia ago using them as tools and weapons.

The atmosphere is strongly reminiscent of Frank Herbert's Dune and of the Hyperion stories by Dan Simmons, but is influenced by many other science fiction and horror books and movies as well, including the Cthulhu Mythos. The Known Worlds are a very superstitious and dangerous place.

Power is administered by five major Noble Houses, five major guilds within the Merchants League, and six major sects of the Universal Church of the Celestial Sun.

While most role-playing situations arise from the strict codes regulating the everyday life of the empire's citizens, the Imperial Age is rife with opportunities for adventure. Following the fall of the old regime, and centuries of darkness and warfare, most worlds have slipped backward to a technology level not much more advanced than 21st century Earth, and a number of alien threats lurk in the shadows. Pushing at the borders of the Known Worlds lurk the mutangenic horror of the Symbiots, the ancient and enigmatic Vau, and the barbarian empires of the Kurgan and the Vuldrok, all waiting for their chance to throw humanity into darkness and chaos.

Players can take the role of either a member of a Noble House, of one of the various merchant guilds, or a member of one of the numerous religious sects. A number of alien species, most notably the human-like 'psychic' Ukar and Obun, and the six-limbed, bestial Vorox, are also available as player characters.

Two separate types of occult abilities exist within the game universe: psychic powers and Theurgy. Psychic powers manifest, generally, from the practitioners' own mental abilities. Psionicists, castigated as 'demon worshippers' and heretics, are often hunted down and killed by the Church, or enrolled in the Church's ranks (after a good bit of 're-training'). Theurgy is a kind of ordained divine sorcery practiced by the Church through various approved rites and is capable of producing miracles, often by calling on the assistance of various saints and angels.

A large library of supplements provides descriptions of locales (planets, space stations, whole sections of space), alien societies, minor houses, guilds and sects, monsters and secret conspiracies, thus expanding the thematic possibilities offered by the setting.

Game system 
The Fading Suns engine uses a simple attribute and skill, level and classless, single d20-powered system, called the Victory Point System (VPS). The second edition of the game's rules solved many issues raised by the earlier rule book, while increasing the amount of data available. The current Revised Edition further updated and streamlined the VPS mechanics.

While generally stereotypical in their template-like form, characters are easily personalized through either life path or points-buy systems.

In 2000, an adaptation of the setting to the popular 3rd edition OGL system was also published - D20 Fading Suns.  For several years, supplements carried rules for both systems.

Holistic Design has released a LARP version of Fading Suns entitled Passion Play.

A fourth edition of Fading Suns is in development, helmed by original writer Bill Bridges.

Authors 
Fading Suns was written by Andrew Greenberg and Bill Bridges, known for their involvement with the original Vampire: The Masquerade and Werewolf: The Apocalypse role-playing games both published by White Wolf Publishing.

Sourcebooks 
Victory Point System:
 1996 First Edition Rulebook,  (OOP)
 1996 Gamemasters Screen First Edition,  (OOP)
 1996 Forbidden Lore: Technology, 
 1996 Byzantium Secundus, 
 1997 Players Companion, 
 1997 Lords of the Known Worlds,  (OOP)
 1997 The Dark between the Stars, 
 1997 Merchants of the Jumpweb, 
 1997 Weird Places, 
 1997 Priests of the Celestial Sun,  (OOP)
 1998 Children of the Gods, 
 1998 Sinners & Saints, 
 1999 Second Edition Rulebook,  (OOP)
 1999 Gamemaster's Screen and Complete Pandemonium, 
 1999 Legions of the Empire, 
 1999 Imperial Survey 1: Hawkwood Fiefs, 1-888906-15-4 (OOP)
 1999 Imperial Survey 2: al Malik Fiefs, 
 1999 War in the Heavens: Lifeweb, 
 2000 Star Crusade, 
 2000 War in the Heavens 2: Hegemony, 
 2000 Imperial Survey 3: Hazat Fiefs, 
 2001 Alien Expeditions: Vorox, 
 2001 Secret Societies: Spies & Revolutionaries, 
 2001 Into the Dark, 
 2001 Imperial Survey 4: Li Halan Fiefs, 
 2001 Imperial Survey 5: Decados Fiefs, 
 2002 Star Crusade 2: Lost Worlds, 
 2002 Secret Societies: Heretics & Outsiders, 
 2002 Lord Erbian's Stellar Bestiary, 
 2003 Alien Expeditions: Orphaned Races Hironem & Ascorbites, 
 2003 Imperial Survey 6: Imperial Fiefs (PDF, as a free download)

Collections:
 2000 Lords & Priests,  (contains Lords of the Known World and Priests of the Celestial Sun)
 2002 Aliens & Deviltry,  (contains Children of the Gods and The Dark Between the Stars)
 2003 Worlds of the Realm,  (contains: Hawkwood Fiefs, al Malik Fiefs, Hazat Fiefs, Li Halan Fiefs, and the previously unprinted Imperial Fiefs)

d20 System:

 2001 Fading Suns: d20, 
 2003 d20 Character Codex, 

Passion Play:

 Passion Play: Fading Suns Live-Action Roleplaying, 

Fiction:

 1998 Tales of the Sinful Stars,  (OOP)

RedBrick Publications 

 2007 Second Edition Revised Rulebook. (Not to be confused with 2012 Fading Suns Player's Guide Revised Edition Core Rulebook)
 Editors: Alex Wichert, Carsten Damm, Kathy Schad, James D. Flowers
 Description: Mostly identical to Second Edition main rulebook. The layout was changed slightly, the index was expanded, important tables were gathered and printed in an appendix. Another adventure (called Pandemonium Unchained) was added.
 2007 A Road So Dark (PDF; now part of the Shards Collection, below)
 Author: Angus McNicholl
 Description: an adventure about a previously unknown jumproute between two stellar systems.
 2007 Imperial Survey Vol. 7: Church Fiefs
 Author: Mat Wakefield
 Description: this details the Church planets Artemis, Holy Terra, Pentateuch, De Moley, and Pyre
 2007 Kraken's Loom (PDF; now part of the Shards Collection, below)
 Author: Angus McNicholl
 Description: this adventure leads the characters into barbarian space in search of a lost heirloom, but the situation is complicated by being the strangers in a strange land.
 2008 Arcane Tech
 Authors: Bill Bridges, Alan Bryden, Brian Campbell, Andrew Greenberg, Lee Hammock, Dave Harrison, Samuel Inabinet, Bill Maxwell, Angus McNicholl, Angelus Michaels, Laura Poplin, Rustin Quaide, Sandra Schneider, Nicky Rea, Jay Verkuilen, James Walker-Bumcrot, Mat Wakefield, Martin Welnicki, Alex Wichert, Gabriel Zarate
 Description: this sourcebook contains reprinted and refreshed material from "Forbidden Lore: Technology", as well as new technological items, ranging from alien technology to weird tech to new weapons and gear.
 2008 Ruinous Folly (PDF; now part of the Shards Collection, below)
 Author: Angus McNicholl
 Description: this adventure takes the characters from a private auction to the turbulent atmosphere of Gargantua in search of a lost treasure, but the treasure has ideas of its own.
 2008 Dead End (PDF; now part of the Shards Collection, below))
 Author: Thomas Baroli
 Description: this adventure takes the characters from a religious ceremony, to an obscure plot of murder and intrigue
 2011 Fading Suns Shards Collection Volume One (Print and PDF Release)
 Author: Thomas Baroli, Angus McNicholl
 Description: compiles and updates the previously released PDF adventures Dead End, Ruinous Folly, Kraken's Loom, and A Road So Dark into one volume.

FASA Games Publications 

 2012 Fading Suns Player's Guide - Revised Edition Core Rulebook. (Not to be confused with 2007 Fading Suns Second Edition Revised Rulebook) -- produced by RedBrick, published by FASA Games, Inc.
 Author: Todd Bogenrief, Vidar Edland, Chris Wiese, Andrew Greenberg, Bill Bridges, Phil Cameron, Richard Ashley, Thomas Baroli, Ruben Ramos, Mark Stout, James Sutton
 Description: Similar in places to the Fading Suns Second Edition, with rules extensively re-written (especially combat rules). Updates and additions throughout.
 2013 Fading Suns Game Master's Guide - Revised Edition Core Rulebook
 Authors: Todd Bogenrief, Vidar Edland, Richard Ashley, Thomas Baroli, Brandon van Buren, Phil Cameron, Tristan Lhomme, Ruben Ramos, Mark Stout, James Sutton, Dennis Watson, and Chris Wiese, with reused material by Bill Bridges, Brian Campbell, Andrew Greenberg, Robert Hatch, Jennifer Hartshorn, Chris Howard, Sam Inabinet, Ian Lemke, Jim More, Rustin Quade
 Description: Chapter 1 - Game Mastering; Chapter 2 - Hazard; Chapter 3 - Antagonists; Chapter 4 - Fiefs & Planets; Chapter 5 - Hawkwood Fiefs; Chapter 6 - al-Malik Fiefs; Chapter 7 - Hazat Fiefs; Chapter 8 - Li Halan Fiefs; Chapter 9 - Decados Fiefs; Chapter 10 - Imperial Fiefs; Chapter 11 - Pandemonium;
 2015 Criticorum Discord - A Fading Suns Drama Book  
 Description: Three dramas for Fading Suns provide the backdrop to the beginnings of an uprising in the Known Worlds. The al-Malik world of Criticorum is highlighted, with each drama taking place on the planet itself, or within the star system.

Ulisses Spiele GmbH
 On November 1, 2016, Holistic Design announced that Ulisses Spiele GmbH has taken over publishing the Fading Suns roleplaying game.
 In 2020 Ulisses started a Kickstarter for several new books.
 In August 2020 Kickstarter backers received the electronic version of the new Fading Suns 3rd edition "Universe Book".
 In October 2020 Kickstarter backers received the electronic version of the new "Character Book", the new "Gamemaster Book" and the new "Intrigues and Escapades".

Reception
In the August 1997 edition of Dragon (Issue 238), Rick Swan liked the sombre setting, but criticized the task resolution system: "Inexplicably, the designers pile on the numbers, adding stuff like effect dice, effect numbers, and complementary actions, all of which are intended to make task resolution more realistic, but just make it more confusing." But Swan liked the rest of the game, and gave it a rating of 5 out of 6, saying, "Although Fading Suns fails to scale the heights of Traveller — the setting isn't as rich, and the rules, though solid, aren't nearly as elegant — it succeeds on its own terms, evoking a vividly imagined future where street smarts count more than computer literacy, where betrayal and despair are more common than sunshine. With nearly 50 pages of background to digest, it's not the easiest game to get into. But for players who like a little anguish with their space opera, it's worth the effort."

Reviews
Arcane #11 (October 1996)
Review in Shadis #29

References

External links 
 Holistic Design - The owners of the Fading Suns game line.
  - The English-language site of the current Fading Suns license-holder.
 FASA Games, Inc. - The current Noble Armada license-holder.
 Review of the 2nd Edition Fading Suns Core Rulebook
 Empire of the Phoenix Throne
 
 Fading Suns MUSH Webpage
 Interview with Bill Bridges and Andrew Greenberg
 Strontium Dog Fading Suns

Campaign settings
Holistic Design games
Role-playing games introduced in 1996
Space opera role-playing games